Sir Henry Hervey Bruce, 3rd Baronet (22 September 1820 – 8 December 1907) was an Irish Conservative politician. He was Member of Parliament for Coleraine from 1862 to 1874, and from 1880 to 1885.

In 1842 he married Marianne Margaret Clifton (d 1891), daughter of Sir Juckes Granville Juckes-Clifton, 8th Baronet of Clifton Hall, Nottingham.

He held the office of High Sheriff of County Londonderry in 1846.
Bruce was elected to the House of Commons at an unopposed by-election in 1862, following the death of the Conservative MP John Boyd. He was re-elected unopposed at the general elections in 1865 and 1868, but was defeated at the 1874 general election by the Liberal candidate Daniel Taylor. He defeated Taylor (by 222 votes to 193) at the 1880 general election, and held the seat until the borough of Coleraine lost its separate parliamentary representation at the 1885 general election.
He held the office of County Grand Master of the County Grand Orange Lodge of Londonderry between 1855 and 1857 
He was Lord Lieutenant of County Londonderry from 1877 to 1907, and was sworn of the Privy Council of Ireland in 1889.

His brother Lloyd Stuart Bruce, b. 1829 was the father of Edith Agnes Kathleen Bruce, the wife of Robert Falcon Scott.

References

External links 
 

1820 births
1907 deaths
Members of the Parliament of the United Kingdom for County Londonderry constituencies (1801–1922)
High Sheriffs of County Londonderry
Irish Conservative Party MPs
UK MPs 1859–1865
UK MPs 1865–1868
UK MPs 1868–1874
UK MPs 1880–1885
Baronets in the Baronetage of the United Kingdom
Members of the Privy Council of Ireland
Lord-Lieutenants of County Londonderry